The 1911 U.S. Open was the 17th U.S. Open, held June 23–26 at Chicago Golf Club in Wheaton, Illinois, a suburb west of Chicago.  Nineteen-year-old John McDermott became the first American-born champion by defeating Mike Brady and George Simpson in an 18-hole playoff.

Two past champions, Alec Ross and Fred McLeod, shared the 36-hole lead on Friday evening at 149 (−3), with McDermott, Brady, and Simpson four shots back at 153, in a five-way tie for fourth.

Ross struggled on a rainy Saturday with 81-82 for 312 (+8) and fell into a tie for ninth. McLeod had a three-stroke lead after 54 holes, but finished with 83 for 308. Simpson posted 79-75 for 307, while Brady tied Simpson with a final round 75. McDermott made a birdie on the final hole for 79 to join Simpson and Brady, forcing a three-way playoff. Sunday was an idle day.

In the playoff on Monday afternoon, McDermott led Brady by four after the turn, with Simpson one more back. Brady then played the next four holes in one-under par while McDermott made three consecutive bogeys, evening up the contest with four holes remaining. McDermott took the lead at the 15th after Brady missed a four-footer (1.2 m) for par, then sealed the championship with an approach to the par-5 18th that settled  from the hole. He two-putted for birdie and 80, two strokes ahead of Brady and five clear of Simpson at 85.

At 19, McDermott became the youngest U.S. Open champion, a mark that still stands, and was also its first American-born champion. He successfully defended his title the following year, but by 1914 he began suffering from mental illness and his career was essentially over at age 23.

The Open Championship in England was held June 26−30 at Sandwich.

This was the first U.S. Open since the death of four-time champion Willie Anderson  (1901, 1903, 1904, 1905); he had played in the previous fourteen editions and died the previous October at age 31.

Course

Past champions in the field 

Source:

Did not play: Laurie Auchterlonie (1902), Harry Vardon (1900), Willie Smith (1899).

Round summaries

First round
Friday, June 23, 1911 (morning)

Source:

Second round
Friday, June 23, 1911 (afternoon)

Source:

Third round
Saturday, June 24, 1911 (morning)

Source:

Final round
Saturday, June 24, 1911 (afternoon)

Source:

Amateurs: Seckel (+9), Sawyer (+15), Phelps (+16), Gardner (+17), Egan (+17), Watson (+17),Ames (+22), Sellers (+31), Devol (+37).

Playoff
Monday, June 26, 1911

Source:

Scorecard

Source:

References

External links
USGA Championship Database

U.S. Open (golf)
Golf in Illinois
Wheaton, Illinois
U.S. Open
U.S. Open (golf)
U.S. Open
June 1911 sports events